Jacob Leander Loose (June 17, 1850 – September 18, 1923) was an American businessman who founded Loose-Wiles Biscuit Company.

Biography
Jacob Loose was born in Greencastle, Indiana on June 17, 1850. He attended high school in Decatur, Illinois, but he was a drop-out at the age of 16. At the age of 20 moved to Kansas, where he opened a dry goods store with his brother in Chetopa.

In 1878, he married Ella Clark from Carthage, Missouri. The couple moved to Kansas City in 1882 and entered the cracker business.

Community involvement
Loose started the Children's Mercy's endowment fund in 1913.

He partially retired after an illness in 1919, and died at the couple's summer home in Gloucester, Massachusetts on September 18, 1923. His funeral in Kansas City was attended by 700 friends and employees. His body was interred in a mausoleum in Elmwood Cemetery.

His will established the Million Dollar Charity Fund.

Ella's continued involvement
Ella Loose supported many causes, but she especially enjoyed providing for children's needs; the couple had had two children, but both died in infancy. She held an annual "shoe party" at her favorite orphanage, Gillis Orphan's home, where each child would get a new pair of shoes and a dollar.  Ella laid the groundwork for the couple's most visible legacy, Loose Park, by purchasing the land at 52nd and Wornall Road that had once been the Kansas City Country Club for and gifting it to the city in 1927 as a memorial to Jacob. When she died, most of her estate went to the Million Dollar Charity Fund. It was Kansas City's first $1 million foundation. This fund, when combined with other trusts, helped launch the Greater Kansas City Community Foundation and Affiliated Trusts.

References

External links
 Greater Kansas City Community Foundation

Philanthropists from Indiana
People from Greencastle, Indiana
1850 births
1923 deaths
People from Decatur, Illinois
People from Labette County, Kansas
Businesspeople from Kansas City, Missouri
Burials at Elmwood Cemetery (Kansas City, Missouri)